Airfix Dogfighter is a flight-combat video game for Microsoft Windows; developed by Unique Development Studios and Paradox Entertainment, published by EON Digital Entertainment, it was released in late 2000 in North America and Europe. 15 planes are at the players' disposal to re-enact World War II in a 1950s home.

The game is based on the Airfix brand of plastic models. Airfix Dogfighter lets players pilot detailed, miniature versions of World War II aircraft through a large, 3D-rendered house. Fly for the Allies or the Axis powers, each with a home base in a different room of the house. Dogfights take place in the yard or throughout a house full of curios, knick-knacks, canisters, and decorations, many of which can be destroyed and which contain special power-ups.

Gameplay

Weaponry
The Airfix Dogfighter engine supports 9 different weapons, 4 of which will become stronger as the player unlocks tech bonuses. The machine gun, cannon, rocket, and bomb weapons are available to both sides and can be upgraded through 5 different tech levels. Each side has two unique weapons in the single player campaign; the Axis can use homing rockets and a "particle beam" laser. However, the Allied forces use floating "paramines" and a Tesla coil capable of shocking multiple units. Last, both forces unlock an atomic bomb in the last campaign mission for their side. All the special weapons start at the highest tech level and are unaffected by bonuses.

Bonuses
Players have 5 tech levels. They start with the first one, which is the simplest, but can, however, acquire stars or crosses (stars for allies, crosses for axis), which are found in destroyed enemies or breakables (items in the surrounding environment that players can destroy). 10 stars upgrade players to the second level, 10 more for third level, 11 stars to the next, and 10 more to get to the final level, which makes destruction of most enemies easy.

Enemy Units
In the campaign, players fight some of the most popular tank designs in World War II, including the Churchill, Tiger Tank, and Sherman. Other units such as battleships, U-boats and personnel carriers are also included.

Territory
For most rooms, players must have a key to get in, which will be revealed depending on the mission. Unless otherwise specified, players cannot go upstairs in Axis or downstairs in Allies, or their airplanes will come under fire from powerful enemy anti-air defense batteries. At the end of the Allied Campaign, players can go wherever they want in the house.

Storyline
This game's plot is based on the invasion of Britain.

Multiplayer
In multiplayer, players can have their own insignia and aircraft. Players also can choose a campaign map or a map created in the editor. Players can also make special practice maps for themselves and can create buildings.

Editor
The editor is where players can create their own maps, choosing from a variety of pre-made rooms and objects.

Reception

The game received "generally favorable reviews" according to the review aggregation website Metacritic.

See also

Wargame (video games) 
List of Paradox Interactive games 
List of PC games

References

External links
 Official site
 

2000 video games
Flight simulation video games
Unique Development Studios games
Windows games
Windows-only games
Paradox Interactive games
Multiplayer and single-player video games
Advergames
Video games about toys
Video games developed in Sweden
Eon Digital Entertainment games